4-Oxalocrotonate tautomerase (EC 5.3.2.6) or 4-OT is an enzyme that converts 2-hydroxymuconate to the αβ-unsaturated ketone, 2-oxo-3-hexenedioate. This enzyme forms part of a bacterial metabolic pathway that oxidatively catabolizes toluene, o-xylene, 3-ethyltoluene, and 1,2,4-trimethylbenzene into intermediates of the citric acid cycle. With a monomer size of just 62 amino acid residues, the 4-Oxalocrotonate tautomerase is one of the smallest enzyme subunits known. However, in solution, the enzyme forms a hexamer of six identical subunits, so the active site may be formed by amino acid residues from several subunits.  This enzyme is also unusual in that it uses a proline residue at the amino terminus as an active site residue.

References 

EC 5.3.2